Morten Rüdiger (born 13 June 1995) is a German professional footballer who plays as a midfielder for VfB Lübeck.

References

External links
 

1995 births
Living people
Sportspeople from Lübeck
German footballers
Association football midfielders
Eintracht Braunschweig II players
FC Rot-Weiß Erfurt players
VfB Lübeck players
3. Liga players
Regionalliga players